Papa Oumar Coly (born 20 May 1975) is a Senegalese former footballer who played as a defender. Besides Senegal, he has played in South Korea. He has been called up to the Senegal national team.

Career

Before the 2001 season, Coly signed for South Korean top flight side Daejeon, becoming their first ever foreign player. In 2001, he helped them win the 2001 Korean FA Cup, their only major trophy. He was seen as a fan favorite. Before the 2004 season, he left Daejeon. After that, he signed for Port Autonome in Senegal.

References

1975 births
Living people
Association football defenders
Daejeon Hana Citizen FC players
Expatriate footballers in South Korea
K League 1 players
Senegal Premier League players
Senegalese expatriate footballers
Senegalese footballers